Igiugig is a census-designated place (CDP) in Lake and Peninsula Borough, Alaska, United States. The population was 68 at the 2020 census, up from 54 in 2010. The village is at the source of the Kvichak River, at the outlet of Lake Iliamna.

History
The word Igiugig means "Like a throat that swallows water". The village is named for its location at the outlet of Lake Iliamna, where it flows into the Kvichak River. Most of the population is made up of Yupik Eskimos, Aleuts, and Athabascan Indians.

Geography
Igiugig is located at  (59.330327, -155.907926), at the southwest end of Lake Iliamna.

Demographics

Igiugig first appeared on the 1970 U.S. Census as an unincorporated village. It was made a census-designated place (CDP) in 1980.

As of the census of 2000, there were 53 people, 16 households, and 13 families residing in the CDP. The population density was 2.7 people per square mile (1.0/km2). There were 20 housing units at an average density of 1.0/sq mi (0.4/km2). The racial makeup of the CDP was 16.98% White, 71.70% Native American, and 11.32% from two or more races. 1.89% of the population were Hispanic or Latino of any race.

There were 16 households, out of which 43.8% had children under the age of 18 living with them, 56.3% were married couples living together, 25.0% had a female householder with no husband present, and 18.8% were non-families. 18.8% of all households were made up of individuals, and 6.3% had someone living alone who was 65 years of age or older. The average household size was 3.31 and the average family size was 3.77.

In the CDP, the population was spread out, with 43.4% under the age of 18, 1.9% from 18 to 24, 32.1% from 25 to 44, 17.0% from 45 to 64, and 5.7% who were 65 years of age or older. The median age was 36 years. For every 100 females, there were 76.7 males. For every 100 females age 18 and over, there were 100.0 males.

The median income for a household in the CDP was $21,750, and the median income for a family was $22,250. The per capita income for the CDP was $13,172. None of the families and 6.9% of the population were below the poverty line. All of the people living in poverty are aged 65 or above.

References

Census-designated places in Alaska
Census-designated places in Lake and Peninsula Borough, Alaska
Road-inaccessible communities of Alaska